Rutherford is a New Jersey Transit railroad station served by the Bergen County Line. The station straddles the border between Rutherford and East Rutherford in Bergen County, New Jersey, United States. The station building and Hoboken Terminal-bound platform is located near a traffic circle at the junction of Park Avenue, Union Avenue, Erie Avenue and Orient Way known as Station Square, with a grade crossing on Park Avenue. The tracks serve as the border between the two municipalities and the Suffern-bound platform and a small parking lot on the same side are actually located in East Rutherford; only the Hoboken-bound platform and a larger commuter lot are located on the Rutherford side.

History

The Paterson and Hudson River Railroad was constructed through Union Township in 1833 (still mostly farmland at this point), and a station was constructed adjacent to the "Boiling Springs" (actually cold, but so named due to its turbulent flow). The service on the railroad line was initially passenger coaches pulled by horses, with the driver having a seat in the coach. The railroad soon switched to locomotive-hauled, purchasing two locomotives built in Baltimore, Maryland. The introduction of the locomotive service helped spur building construction and development in the area around Boiling Springs. The increased demand led the railroad to build a new station and ticket office as they bought land in the area to speculate on future development. The Erie Railroad which acquired the P&HR constructed a depot that was triangular in design made out of brick. The station depot was replaced in 1862. This structure in turn was replaced by the current construction of 1897. Around this time, the boroughs of Rutherford and East Rutherford were carved out from Union Township, choosing the railroad tracks as the mutual border.

The station building has been listed in the New Jersey Register of Historic Places and National Register of Historic Places since 1984 and is part of the Operating Passenger Railroad Stations Thematic Resource.

Restoration
A two phase restoration project was started by New Jersey Transit in May 2008. The first phase to restore the outside of the building cost $1.4 million and was completed in June 2009. The second phase of the project was to restore the interior and cost $1.9 million. The second phase was completed on October 25, 2010.

Station layout
The station has two tracks, each with a low-level side platform.

See also
 List of New Jersey Transit stations
 National Register of Historic Places listings in Bergen County, New Jersey

Bibliography

References

External links

 Station from Park Avenue from Google Maps Street View
 Station House from Google Maps Street View
 Photos of Rutherford Station

NJ Transit Rail Operations stations
Railway stations in Bergen County, New Jersey
Railway stations on the National Register of Historic Places in New Jersey
East Rutherford, New Jersey
Rutherford, New Jersey
Former Erie Railroad stations
Queen Anne architecture in New Jersey
Renaissance Revival architecture in New Jersey
New Jersey Register of Historic Places
1833 establishments in New Jersey
Railway stations in the United States opened in 1833